Manoj–Gyan was an Indian musical duo consisting of composers Manoj Bhatnagar and Gyan Varma. In the 1980s, the two collaboratively composed music for a few Hindi-language as well as Tamil-language films. Manoj hails from the state of Uttar Pradesh, while Gyan is from Punjab.

About 
In the 1980s the duo ended up composing for movies like Oomai Vizhigal, Senthoora Poove and Inaindha Kaigal, and these movies had several hit songs.

In particular, the song "Tholvi Nilayena Ninaithal" sung by P B Srinivas in the movie Oomai Vizhigal became a runaway hit. The song went on to assume the role of an unofficial anthem of sorts for the LTTE in Sri Lanka.

The two split up around 1989. Following the split, Gyan Verma scored music for a couple of films on his own including Inaindha Kaigal and Sathya Vaakku. Manoj also tried his hand at scoring in a film titled Panthaya Kuthiraigal, but the film wasn't released to the public.

Years later, Manoj built a recording theater and eventually returned as a producer-music director in 1998, assuming the name of Manoj Bhatnagar. He produced and also directed the music for two films "Endrendrum Kadhal" (starring Vijay) and "Good Luck" (starring Prashant). Both films received positive response with the audiences and critics.

Filmography

References 

Hindi film score composers
Tamil film score composers